St. Andrew's-by-the-Sea is a historic Episcopal chapel on Church Road, southeast of the junction with South Road and Route 1A in Rye, New Hampshire. Built in 1876, it is the only known religious work of Boston architects Winslow & Wetherell, and one of a modest number of churches built for summer vacationers in the state. It is an eclectic mix of Gothic Revival and Stick Style, and was listed on the National Register of Historic Places in 2001.

Description and history
St. Andrew's-by-the-Sea stands near New Hampshire's seacoast in southern Rye, on the east side of Church Road south of Jenness State Beach. It is a single-story structure built of stone and timber, with brick quoining at the corners. It has a slate roof and a small belfry topped by a pyramidal roof. The chapel's stained glass windows were designed by John La Farge, the Connick Studios, and Tiffany & Co. Other major features of the interior include massive timber trusses supporting the roof, and an elaborately carved oak pulpit. The church property includes a small graveyard and is surrounded by a low stone wall, with a lich gate built in 1977 as a reconstruction of an original.

In 1864 Rye's first Episcopal services were held at the nearby Farragut Hotel. This chapel was built in 1876 to serve Rye's large summer resort community. It was designed by the Boston architects Winslow & Wetherell, and is their only known work in New Hampshire. It is also their only known religious work; the partners worked primarily on commercial projects, and are best known for their work done after the Great Boston fire of 1872.

The chapel is still used for Episcopal services in the summer.

See also
National Register of Historic Places listings in Rockingham County, New Hampshire

References

External links
St. Andrew's-by-the-Sea website

Episcopal church buildings in New Hampshire
Churches on the National Register of Historic Places in New Hampshire
Queen Anne architecture in New Hampshire
Churches completed in 1876
19th-century Episcopal church buildings
Churches in Rockingham County, New Hampshire
National Register of Historic Places in Rockingham County, New Hampshire
Rye, New Hampshire
1876 establishments in New Hampshire